Pediatrics is a peer-reviewed medical journal published by the American Academy of Pediatrics. In the inaugural January 1948 issue, the journal's first editor-in-chief, Hugh McCulloch, articulated the journal's vision: "The content of the journal is... intended to encompass the needs of the whole child in his physiologic, mental, emotional, and social structure. The single word, Pediatrics, has been chosen to indicate this catholic intent."

Pediatrics has been continuously published by the American Academy of Pediatrics since January 1948. According to the Journal Citation Reports, the journal has a 2020 impact factor of 7.124, ranking it fourth out of 119 journals in the category "Pediatrics".

Editors
The following persons have been editor-in-chief of Pediatrics:
1948–1954 Hugh McCulloch
1954–1961 Charles D. May
1962–1974 Clement A. Smith
1974–2009 Jerold F. Lucey
2009–present Lewis First

References

External links 
 

Publications established in 1948
Pediatrics journals
Monthly journals
English-language journals